Tdsoft is an Israeli company, founded in 1994 by Yosi Albagli, Arie Shaham and Eytan Radian, together with Teledata Communications. Tdsoft developed V5.X based products, including V5Core Software, V5Proxi, and Tdgate family of TDM / ATM and Voice over IP access gateways.

Investors in Tdsoft included Apax, Gemini, HarbourVest Partners and Cisco Systems.

In 2001, Tdsoft acquired the Hunt 8110 product line from Cisco. In 2004, Tdsoft acquired the assets of Be-Connected from Telrad, and expanded its offering of access gateways.

In November 2005, Tdsoft took control over VocalTec (NASDAQ:VOCL), in a way of a reverse merger, and continued the combined business, by providing Voice over IP solutions to Telecommunications service providers, under the public entity and brand name of VocalTec.

See also
 List of VoIP companies

References
 Ray Le Maistre. "Tdsoft Saves VocalTec", Light Reading, October 28, 2005.
 Charlie Meredith-Hardy. "Red Herring Selects Tdsoft for the 2005 Red Herring 100 Europe", TMCnet, April 13, 2005.
 Business Editors/High-Tech Writers. "Tdsoft Acquires the Be Connected Total Access Solution — TAS", BNET, May 10, 2004.
 ITworld.com. "Cisco sells recent acquisition to Israeli firm", ITworld.com, June 18, 2001.

Networking companies
VoIP companies
Software companies established in 1994
Apax Partners companies
Software companies of Israel
VoIP companies of Israel